Jagatpur may refer to:

Jagatpur, India
Jagatpur, Gandaki, Nepal
Jagatpur, Narayani, Nepal
Jagatpur, Sagarmatha, Nepal
Jagatpur, Punjab, is a village in Shaheed Bhagat Singh Nagar district of Punjab State, India.
Jagarpur, Raebareli, a village in Uttar Pradesh, India